Doe Run is an unincorporated community in West Marlborough Township in Chester County, Pennsylvania, United States. Doe Run is located at the intersection of Pennsylvania Route 82 and Pennsylvania Route 841.

Notable people
Anthony C. Campbell, United States attorney for the Territory of Wyoming (1885-1890)

References

Unincorporated communities in Chester County, Pennsylvania
Unincorporated communities in Pennsylvania